Continuous is the sixth extended play by the South Korean boy group Victon. It was released on March 9, 2020, with the lead single "Howling", by Play M Entertainment and distributed by Kakao Entertainment.

Background and release 
The EP was released on March 9, 2020, with the first promotional appearance on a music show on March 12. The EP was the group's first release with Han Seung-woo since his appearance on Produce X 101 and subsequent debut in X1.

Commercial performance	
The album ranked number two on the Gaon weekly album chart. In its first month of sales, it sold 87,971 copies in South Korea, and had sold 95,709 copies by the end of 2020. It also ranked 38 on the Oricon weekly album chart in Japan, the group's highest spot on the chart at its time of release.

Track listing

Charts

Album

Weekly charts

Monthly chart

Sales

References 
 

2020 EPs
Victon EPs
Korean-language EPs